Cowboys and Indians is an album by The Jeevas, released October 6, 2003.

Track listing
All songs by Crispian Mills, unless otherwise noted.

 "Black & Blue"
 "Have You Ever Seen the Rain?" (John Fogerty)
 "Healing Hands"
 "The Way You Carry On"
 "I Can't Help Myself"
 "Back Home"
 "Que Pasa (con tu culo)?"
 "How Much Do You Suck?"
 "Masters of War" (Bob Dylan)
 "Stoned Love"
 "Girl Without a Name"
 "Good Man Down"
 "Rio Grande"

2003 albums